Githa, a given name, may refer to:

Githa Hariharan, Indian author and editor 
Githa Sowerby, English playwright, children's writer, and member of the Fabian Society
Gytha Thorkelsdóttir, also known as Githa, Danish noble

See also 
Ongole Gittha, 2013 Indian film
Geetha (disambiguation)
Gytha (disambiguation)

English-language feminine given names